Kaisi Aurat Hoon Main , previously titled Kaisi Aurat Ho Tum is a Pakistani drama serial, which was first aired on 2 May 2018 on Hum TV replacing Dar Si Jaati Hai Sila.  It stars Nadia Khan and Faisal Rehman.

The drama focuses on struggles of women in society. It is directed by Fahim Burney and written by Saima Akram Chudhery.

Plot 

The story is about a husband who manipulates his wife emotionally and make her do bizarre things.

Cast 
 Nadia Khan as Maham Moiz h
 Faisal Rehman as Moiz 
 Ali Josh as Taimoor
 Saniya Shamshad as Savera
 Adla Khan as Amal
 Arslan Rafiq Mughal as Jawad
 Mareeha Safdar as Beenish (Biya)
 Daniyal Arshad as Danish
 Marium Shafi as Maham's mother
 Ruhi Bano as Moiz's mother
 Sana Butt
 Hammad Abbas
 Umair Rafique
 Saba Shahid
 Saima Butt
 Samina Butt
 Shamma Arif
 Kamran Sheikh
 maria malik as rania
 Moosa as Ayan (Child star)
 Banita as Isma (Child star)

Guest appearances 
 Uzma Khan as Sara Hamdan
 Saim Ali as Ahmed Shuja
 Wali Hamid Ali Khan as Haider

References

External links 
 

Pakistani drama television series
2018 Pakistani television series debuts
2018 Pakistani television series endings
Urdu-language television shows
Hum TV original programming
Hum TV